Acacia nana, also known as the small red-leaved wattle, is a shrub belonging to the genus Acacia and the subgenus Phyllodineae where it is endemic to eastern Australia.

Description
Like most species of Acacia it has phyllodes rather than true leaves. The evergreen phyllodes have a straight narrowly elliptic to oblanceolate shaped phyllodes with an excentric mucro. It has racemose inflorescences with spherical flower-heads that contain 7 to 12 golden coloured flowers.

Distribution
It is native to a disjunct area in the northern and central tablelands of New South Wales. The northernmost populations are found around Longford and Ebor and the southern populations are in the western Blue Mountains around Capetree and Cullen Bullen.

See also
 List of Acacia species

References

nana
Flora of New South Wales
Plants described in 2002